The Schreder HP-16 is an American mid-wing, single seat, V tailed, FAI Standard Class glider that was designed by Richard Schreder.

Design and development
After the failure of the HP-15 to perform well in the 1969 US Nationals Schreder started the HP-16 with a new design philosophy. Avoiding the extremely high aspect ratio that the 15 had, he opted for a more modest 21.5:1 aspect ratio and larger wing area to improve performance in weak conditions. The HP-16's wing has 50% more wing area than the HP-15 and uses a Wortmann 67-150 airfoil.

Like other Schreder designs the HP-16 is of all-metal construction, but with the wing skins bonded to foam ribs rather than using rivets to provide a smoother surface. The bonded construction also cut building time. The wing features the signature Schreder 90° flaps that allow steep descents and the use of small fields for landing.

The HP-16s were all amateur-built aircraft and about 20 were completed and flown.

Operational history
In April 2011 there were still eleven HP-16s registered with the US Federal Aviation Administration and two registered with Transport Canada.

Aircraft on display
National Soaring Museum - 1, listed as "in storage"

Specifications (variant specified)

See also

References

External links
Photo of HP-16 with a T-tail in flight

1970s United States sailplanes
Schreder aircraft
Aircraft first flown in 1971